Azov-Black Sea Krai (Azovo-Chernomorskiy kray) was an early krai of the Russian SFSR of the Soviet Union. Its capital was Rostov-on-Don.

It was formed on 10 January 1934 out of the North Caucasus Krai. According to the 1937 All-Union Census, it had population of 5,601,759.

On 13 September 1937 it was split into Krasnodar Krai and Rostov Oblast.

References

1934 establishments in Russia
1937 disestablishments in Russia
Former administrative units of Russia
History of Rostov Oblast